Yechiel Shemi (1922-2003) was an Israeli sculptor. His environmental sculptures are displayed in open spaces around the country.

Biography
Yechiel Stizberg (later Shemi), was born to Moshe and Esther Stizberg. When he was two months old the family immigrated to Mandate Palestine and settled in Haifa. At the age of 14 he joined the Mahane Avoda youth movement and began to study art with Paul Henich. In 1938, he was one of the founders of Kibbutz Beit HaArava, located north of the Dead Sea. Alongside his agricultural work, Stizberg created landscape drawings and paintings, but then moved to sculpting.

In 1942 he joined his friend Yitzhak Danziger's studio where he painted for 3 months. In 1945 he changed his last name to Shemi and joined the HeHalutz Movement as a courier, carrying out missions in Italy, France and Egypt. While on assignment in New York, he studied with Chaim Gross, who exposed him to modern art and art history.

During the War of Independence, Kibbutz Bet Haarava was abandoned and all the artwork he left in the kibbutz was lost. Upon his return to Israel in 1949, he joined  Kibbutz Kabri in the Galilee. In 1950-52, Shemi served as the kibbutz secretary. Influenced by Avigdor Stematsky and Joseph Zaritsky, he became a member of the New Horizons Group in 1952. In 1966 Shemi moved to Kibbutz Gadot for a half year.

Art career
In 1959-1961, Shemi studied art in Paris. In 1977-1979, he taught sculpting and lectured on environmental sculpture at Oranim Teachers College. He also taught at the Technion in Haifa and the Ein Hod artist's colony. Shemi was a member of New Horizons group. In the mid-1950s Shemi's artwork changed drastically, one of the changes he made was changing his material for his sculptures from wood and stone to metal materials. His first metal bird sculpture was made in 1955. During the years 1955-1957 Shemi created a series of sculptures of abstract figures of animals and humans. A few of these sculptures were exhibited in the seventh exhibition of New Horizons that opened in 1957 at the Independence Hall (Israel). Exhibiting some 30 sculptures by Shemi.  During 1957-1956, Shemi created the sculpture group "Nest".

In 1962 Shemi began to create expressive works from scrap metal. During the 1960s he showed his assemblage sculpture in solo exhibitions at Centre for Fine Arts, Brussels in 1964. Shemi had additional solo exhibitions at the Tel Aviv Museum of Art in 1966 and at the Israel Museum in 1967. He also created  two large public sculptures.  

In the late 1960s and throughout the 1970s Shemi changed his technique. Instead of using ready-made objects, he reduced his art to geometric shapes. 
In 1995 a retrospective exhibit was held at the Tefen Sculpture Garden. 

In 1981 Shemi was awarded the Sandberg Prize from the Israel Museum. In 1986, the Israel Prize for sculpture, together with Batia Lishansky. In 1988 Adam Baruch published the book "Yehiel Shemi: Sculptures" and a solo exhibit was help in the Ramat Gan Museum of Art.

Awards and recognition
After a show in the United States in the 1960s, the Museum of Modern Art acquired his work. Shemi was the first Israeli artist to have his work purchased by the MoMa.

Shemi won the Sandberg Prize in 1981 and the Israel Prize for sculpture in 1986. In 1966 and 1997, the Tel Aviv Museum of Art mounted exhibitions of his work.

In 1997 a retrospective exhibit of his works was held at the Tel Aviv Museum of Art with a biographical catalog by Michael Sgan-Cohen. In 1998 the "Yehiel Shemi Papers" was published by the author Agassi,  based on a series of conversations with Shemi.

 1954 Dizengoff Prize for Painting and Sculpture, Municipality of Tel Aviv-Yafo
 1966 Milo Club Prize
 1981 Sandberg Prize for Israeli Art, Israel Museum, Jerusalem
 1986 Israel Prize for Lifetime Achievement in Sculpture
 2000 The Mendel and Eva Pundik Foundation Prize for an Israeli Artist, Tel Aviv Museum of Art, Tel Aviv

Education 
 1937-38 Reali High School, Haifa
 1959-1961 advanced studies, Paris, France
 1941 Advanced studies in sculpture with Itzhak Danziger, Tel Aviv
 1940s Studied sculpture with Chaim Gross, New York

Teaching 
 1977-79 Oranim Art Institute, Tivon, sculpture and environmental sculpture
 1977-78 Art School, Ein Hod, sculpture
 1977-79 Technion, Haifa, Lecturer on environmental design

See also
Visual arts in Israel
Israeli sculpture 
List of public art in Israel
Culture of Israel

References

External links 
 
 
 
 

Israeli sculptors
Israel Prize in sculpture recipients
1922 births
2003 deaths
Academic staff of Oranim Academic College
Sandberg Prize recipients
20th-century sculptors
Canaanites (movement)
Polish emigrants to Mandatory Palestine
Israeli expatriates in France